Cari Read (born September 4, 1970) is a Canadian synchronized swimmer.

Read was a member of the successful Canadian synchronized swimming team that won silver medals at the 1991 World Aquatics Championships, the 1994 World Aquatics Championships and the 1995 Pan American Games, before going on to earn a silver medal in synchronized team at the 1996 Summer Olympics in Atlanta.

References

External links
Alberta Sports Hall of Fame profile 

1970 births
Living people
Canadian synchronized swimmers
Olympic silver medalists for Canada
Olympic synchronized swimmers of Canada
Synchronized swimmers at the 1996 Summer Olympics
Olympic medalists in synchronized swimming
World Aquatics Championships medalists in synchronised swimming
Synchronized swimmers at the 1991 World Aquatics Championships
Medalists at the 1996 Summer Olympics
Pan American Games medalists in synchronized swimming
Synchronized swimmers at the 1995 Pan American Games
Pan American Games silver medalists for Canada
Medalists at the 1995 Pan American Games